Alsyapinsky is a rural locality (a khutor) in Galushkinskoye Rural Settlement, Novoanninsky District, Volgograd Oblast, Russia. The population was 152 as of 2010. There are 2 streets.

Geography 
Alsyapinsky is located on the Khopyorsko-Buzulukskaya Plain, on the right bank of the Buzuluk River, 24 km northeast of Novoanninsky (the district's administrative centre) by road. Rog-Izmaylovsky is the nearest rural locality.

References 

Rural localities in Novoanninsky District